is a Japanese football player. She plays for Omiya Ardija Ventus in the WE League. She played for Japan national team.

Club career
Sakai was born in Chiba Prefecture on January 10, 1989. After graduating from high school, she joined Tasaki Perule FC in 2007. However, the club was disbanded in 2008 due to financial strain. So, she moved to INAC Kobe Leonessa in 2009. In 2012, she moved to new club Vegalta Sendai (later Mynavi Vegalta Sendai).

National team career
In November 2008, Sakai was selected Japan U-20 national team for 2008 U-20 World Cup. In March 2011, she was selected Japan national team for 2011 Algarve Cup. At this competition, on March 9, she debuted against Sweden.

National team statistics

References

External links

Japan Football Association

1989 births
Living people
Association football people from Chiba Prefecture
Japanese women's footballers
Japan women's international footballers
Nadeshiko League players
Tasaki Perule FC players
INAC Kobe Leonessa players
Mynavi Vegalta Sendai Ladies players
Women's association football defenders